Covington Township may refer to the following places in the United States:

 Covington Township, Washington County, Illinois
 Covington Township, Michigan
 Covington Township, Clearfield County, Pennsylvania
 Covington Township, Lackawanna County, Pennsylvania
 Covington Township, Tioga County, Pennsylvania

Township name disambiguation pages